Łukasz Kubot and Marcelo Melo were the defending champions, but lost in the quarterfinals to Marcel Granollers and Rajeev Ram.

Granollers and Ram won the title, defeating Jean-Julien Rojer and Horia Tecău in the final, 6–4, 6–4.

Seeds
All seeds received a bye into the second round.

Draw

Finals

Top half

Bottom half

References
 Main Draw

Doubles